Karel Engel (28 May 1940 – 30 December 2018) was a Czech wrestler who competed in the 1972 Summer Olympics.

References

External links
 

1940 births
2018 deaths
Olympic wrestlers of Czechoslovakia
Wrestlers at the 1972 Summer Olympics
Czech male sport wrestlers